Aiphanes duquei is a species of palm that is endemic to Colombia.  Known from only a small area in the Cordillera Occidental, it is threatened by habitat loss and forest management practices.

Description
Stems grow singly, not in clonal clusters. Individuals have between 8 and 9 leaves which consists of a leaf sheath, a petiole and a rachis. Leaves each bear 23 to 35 pairs of leaflets.

The female flowers are larger— long.

Taxonomy
The species was first described by German botanist Max Burret in 1937 based on a collection made in November 1936 by Colombian botanist J.M. Duque.  The generic epithet, Aiphanes, coined by German botanist Carl Ludwig Willdenow in 1801, derives from Greek ai, meaning "always" and phaneros, meaning "evident", "visible" or "conspicuous".  The specific epithet, duquei, honours the collector, J.M. Duque.

Burret placed Aiphanes duquei in the subgenus Brachyanthera, one of the two subgenera into which he divided the genus.  While Borchsenius and Bernal recognised the other subgenus, Macroanthera as a potentially cohesive unit, they concluded that the remaining subgenus Brachyanthera would be overly heterogeneous, and consequently abandoned Burret's use of subgenera.

Distribution and status
It is found in cloudy, lower montane wet and rain forests, primarily in the Munchique and Farallones de Cali National Parks.

On the basis of its limited distribution, and the fact that its habitat is vulnerable to expanding agriculture and forest management practices, it is classified as a vulnerable species.

References

duquei
Endemic flora of Colombia
Vulnerable plants
Taxonomy articles created by Polbot
Taxa named by Max Burret